Peligroso may refer to:
 Peligroso (Hamlet album), 1992
 Peligroso (Carlos Baute album), 2004